Pranjit Singha Roy is a politician from Tripura, India. In 2013 assembly elections, he represented Radhakishorpur constituency in Gomati district in Tripura Legislative Assembly.

In 2016, he was one of the six MLAs from Indian National Congress who joined All India Trinamool Congress, due to unhappiness with party because of allying Communist Party of India (Marxist) in 2016 West Bengal Legislative Assembly election.

In August 2017, he was one of the six MLAs from All India Trinamool Congress who joined Bharatiya Janata Party after they cross voted against the party lines in 2017 Indian presidential election.

References

People from Gomati district
Living people
Year of birth missing (living people)
Tripura MLAs 2018–2023
State cabinet ministers of Tripura
Indian National Congress politicians from Tripura
Trinamool Congress politicians
Bharatiya Janata Party politicians from Tripura
Tripura MLAs 2023–2028